Possible Worlds is a 2000 Canadian film adaptation of the 1990 play of the same name by John Mighton.
The film is directed by Robert Lepage, and stars Tom McCamus and Tilda Swinton. The film's musical score is by George Koller.

Mighton approached Lepage to direct an adaption of his play. Lepage, who had seen a tape of Daniel Brook's minimalistic 1998 production, agreed to the request. He liked Mighton's combining of art and science and the theme of diverse, multilayered identity.

The Australian film festival Possible Worlds, running since 2006, was named after the film.

Plot synopsis

The film follows the script of the play. George Barber (Tom McCamus) is a mathematician having strange dreams. He continuously meets a woman, Joyce (Tilda Swinton), at a bar. Sometimes, she is a scientist, sometimes she is a stockbroker, and she doesn't seem to remember him from a moment to another. He has also a dream about strange men who move stones here and there on a rocky waterfront. There is a man in this dream, the Guide (Gabriel Gascon), who is also a neuroscientist in real life.

The neuroscientist is interviewed by two detectives (Sean McCann and Rick Miller) about a serial killer stealing the brains of its victims. After agreeing to follow him on a beach, Joyce with George, sees a distant red light flickering on the ocean horizon. In the neuroscientist's lab, many brains are connected to red lights, indicating brain activity. The neuroscientist lies near a machine containing a brain and tries to influence the brain by thoughts.

George goes to see a doctor, who is the neuroscientist, about his strange dreams. The detectives arrest the neuroscientist, now understanding he is the one stealing brains for his experiments on consciousness. George's corpse was found without his brain, which is now kept artificially alive in the machine.

Joyce Barber is told her husband's brain is still alive but experiencing life in a discontinuous dream state. In the final scene, George and Joyce are again reunited on the beach, but this time the red light on the horizon goes out for good. It is suggested the real-life Joyce agreed to end George's consciousness out of compassion.

Awards

Won
 Best Achievement in Art Direction/Production Design - Genie Awards
 Best Achievement in Editing - Genie Awards
 Special Jutra - Jutra Awards

Nominated
 Achievement in Direction - Genie Awards
 Best Achievement in Cinematography- Genie Awards
 Best Motion Picture - Genie Awards
 Best Performance by an Actress in a Leading Role - Genie Awards
 Best Art Direction - Jutra Awards
 Best Cinematography - Jutra Awards

Streaming
As of 2017 the film has been released on the Canada Media Fund's Encore+ YouTube channel.

Reception 
On Rotten Tomatoes, the film has an aggregate score of 60% based on 3 positive and 2 negative critic reviews.

References

External links

English-language Canadian films
Canadian science fiction films
2000 films
Films based on Canadian plays
2000 science fiction films
Canadian romantic fantasy films
Films directed by Robert Lepage
2000s English-language films
2000s Canadian films